Panagiotis Katsikas (born 10 March 1999) is a Greek professional footballer who plays as a goalkeeper for Super League 2 club Panserraikos.

References 

1999 births
Living people
Football League (Greece) players
Super League Greece players
Anagennisi Karditsa F.C. players
PAS Lamia 1964 players
Panserraikos F.C. players
Association football goalkeepers
Footballers from Athens
Greek footballers